Dumar-e Meyani (also Romanized as Dūmār-e Meyānī) is a village in Saghder Rural District, Jebalbarez District, Jiroft County, Kerman Province, Iran. At the 2006 census, its population was 98, in 30 families.

References 

Populated places in Jiroft County